Frank Jefferis (3 July 1884 – 21 May 1938) was an English footballer.

Playing career
He initially played football for his local non-league team, Fordingbridge Turks, before being invited for a trial at The Dell by Southampton of the Southern League in March 1905. During his trial period he scored two hat-tricks, prompting The Saints to quickly sign him up, paying Fordingbridge Turks a donation of £5.

He made his debut for the "Saints" in a 1–1 draw against New Brompton on 18 November 1905, taking over from Jimmy Soye at inside-right. At Southampton he linked up well with the other forwards, George Smith, John Bainbridge and John Lewis, as well as showing deft touches on the ball. In 1907–08 he played in all six FA Cup matches as The Saints reached the semi-finals, losing to Wolverhampton Wanderers who went on to take the cup in the final. His best seasons were 1908–09 and 1909–10, in each of which he scored 13 goals. His form dropped slightly the following season, but before the season was over he was transferred to Everton in March 1911 for a fee of £1,500.

While at Everton he won two England caps in 1912, and later helped the team win the 1914–15 League championship. His career at Everton was interrupted by World War I, but he continued to play for them after the cessation of hostilities.

He later played for Preston North End and Southport before finishing his career as a trainer with Millwall where he collapsed and died at their training ground in May 1938.

Honours
Everton
 Football League championship: 1914–15

References

External links

Everton career details

1884 births
1938 deaths
People from Fordingbridge
English footballers
Southampton F.C. players
Everton F.C. players
Preston North End F.C. players
Southport F.C. players
England international footballers
Association football forwards
Southern Football League players
FA Cup Final players